Taifenglu station, is an interchange station of Line 3 and Line S8 of the Nanjing Metro.

References

Railway stations in Jiangsu
Railway stations in China opened in 2014
Nanjing Metro stations